The first robot-assisted double heart valve replacement was carried out in the Chennai region of India at Chettinad Health City. This is the first instance of such a procedure using robotic surgery. The surgery was carried out by Dr R Ravi Kumar, the director of the Institute of Cardiovascular Disease and head of the Robotic Surgery Centre at Chettinad.

References

External links
 Press conference discussing the surgery

Computer-assisted surgery